Rafael Carmona (October 2, 1972 – August 2, 2021) was a former Major League Baseball pitcher for the Seattle Mariners. He played for them from - with his best season being . He appeared in 53 games, mostly relief, and went 8–3 with a 4.28 ERA and 62 strikeouts.
On November 30, 1997, Carmona was in a car accident in Puerto Rico. He broke two bones in his right arm. The injury largely ended his career.

Carmona died on August 2, 2021, aged 48.

See also
 List of Major League Baseball players from Puerto Rico

References

External links
Baseball-Reference

1972 births
2021 deaths
Seattle Mariners players
Major League Baseball pitchers
Major League Baseball players from Puerto Rico
Bellingham Mariners players
Riverside Pilots players
Tacoma Rainiers players
Port City Roosters players
Lancaster JetHawks players
Orlando Rays players
People from Río Piedras, Puerto Rico